Arcadia–Beverly Hills Historic District is a national historic district in Baltimore, Maryland, United States. It is a cohesive residential suburb comprising approximately 30 irregularly shaped blocks containing some 900 buildings.  They are primarily freestanding masonry and frame houses set back from the streets with small front yards. Early-20th century suburban architectural styles represented in the district include foursquare, bungalows, early suburban villas, Colonial Revival, Tudor Revival, and Pueblo Revival.  Also included are two churches, a  cemetery, and a variety of commercial buildings along Harford and Belair Roads.  Herring Run Park provides a wooded park setting for the community. The earliest structure in the community was constructed in 1887, and the district had substantially achieved its existing form and appearance by 1950.

It was added to the National Register of Historic Places in 2004.

References

External links
, including photo from 2004, at Maryland Historical Trust
Boundary Map of the Arcadia–Beverly Hills Historic District, Baltimore City, at Maryland Historical Trust

Historic districts on the National Register of Historic Places in Baltimore